Ian Corcoran (born 11 May 1963) is a former Scotland international rugby union player. His regular playing position was Hooker.

Rugby Union career

Amateur career

Corcoran played for Gala.

Provincial career

Corcoran played for South of Scotland District.

International career

Corcoran was capped by Scotland 'B' against France 'B' in 1990.

Corcoran was capped by Scotland 'A' twice, against Spain and Italy in 1992.

Corcoran was capped once for Scotland, in 1992.

References

1963 births
Living people
Scottish rugby union players
Scotland international rugby union players
Rugby union players from Edinburgh
Scotland 'A' international rugby union players
Gala RFC players
Rugby union hookers
Scotland 'B' international rugby union players
South of Scotland District (rugby union) players